The 605 League is a high school athletic conference in southeastern Los Angeles County, California affiliated with the CIF Southern Section.

Schools
As of the 2019–20 school year, the members in the league are:
Artesia High School
Cerritos High School
Glenn High School
Oxford Academy
Pioneer High School
Whitney High School

References

CIF Southern Section leagues